Faust and Marguerite may refer to:

Faust and Marguerite (opera), an opera
Faust and Marguerite (1900 film), directed by Edwin S. Porter
Faust and Marguerite (1904 film), or Faust et Marguerite, directed by Georges Méliès
Faust and Marguerite (1911 film), or Faust et Marguerite, starring Gaston Modot

See also
Faust (disambiguation)
Marguerite (disambiguation)